The Battle of Wadi al-Batin or Battle of Ruqi Pocket took place before the beginning of the Desert Storm operations on 16 February 1991. This is not to be confused with the "Battle of Wadi al-Batin" which was fought later in the four-day ground war between elements of the 1st Cavalry Division (United States) and the Iraqi Republican Guard.

Iraqis thought that Coalition forces were prepping the Wadi al-Batin for the main attack. The desired effect was that the Iraqis would think that the main coalition ground attack would come up the Wadi Al Batin, a natural invasion route, and they would therefore reinforce their forces there, at the expense of the Western flank, where VII Corps would conduct the main attack.

Deception movements
As American forces secretly redeployed from the southern Kuwaiti border to the northwest, "deception cells" were left in the south. These units built a computer-generated electronic network which simulated an intense VHF-UHF wireless traffic. When the Iraqi intelligence caught these "radio calls"—some of them only static hiss—they immediately concluded that the bulk of American forces were still entrenched south of the border. Another military deception was the building of fake bunkers and the shuttling of bogus vehicle convoys, only intended to churn up great clouds of dust. Decoy tanks added to the deception of the unsuspecting Iraqi army.

The feint
By mid February, General Franks ordered U.S. 1st Cavalry Division to conduct a thrust along the border between Iraq and Kuwait. This misdirection would allow the coalition forces to perform the famous "Hail Mary" to the West as the Iraqis focused on the Wadi.

Operation Berm Buster
On 15 February, TF 1-32, supported by the division's 8th Engineers, breached the defensive berm built by the Iraqis on the frontier. The 155 mm howitzers of the Division's 3-82nd Field Artillery Regiment kept the Iraqi positions under fire in the course of this operation, pounding seven pre-established targets. The Iraqis retaliated with sporadic mortar fire.

TF 1-32 Armor Scout Platoon, along with the Mortar Platoon and elements of D Company, remained in position overnight.  They destroyed a border guard post and ambushed an Iraqi reconnaissance patrol, causing at least 3 Iraqi casualties.

Operation Red Storm
The first phase of the feint was a night attack. Fire support from the 82nd Field Artillery Regiment was required again. 
The artillery was temporarily reduced to 50% percent when a howitzer was stuck in an antitank ditch, preventing the rest of the convoy from moving ahead. Two soldiers were injured in the accident. Undeterred, the Regiment carried out a precision shelling on an Iraqi radar facility just before 1:00 AM of 16 February.
The 82nd immediately moved out of the area after the mission was completed, and a raid by Apache helicopters hit selected targets deep behind the Iraqi lines.

Operation Knight Strike

On the evening of 19 February, the 1st Cavalry followed up the artillery attack with a Reconnaissance in Force by Task Force 1-5 CAV (Black Knights) of the 2nd Black Jack Brigade, 1st Cavalry Division. The Task Force consisted two M1A1 Abrams Tank Companies, two M2A2 Bradley Fighting Vehicle Companies, an M901 Anti Tank Company, Command and Control elements from the Headquarters of 2nd Brigade, elements of C Battery 4-5 ADA (Stinger and Vulcan Anti Aircraft Systems) and in a combat trains location, elements of the forward support battalion (C Co medical evac). One of the first reaction of the Iraqis, besides firing sporadic mortar rounds, was to set oil trenches on fire.

On 20 February, 1-5 CAV broke the border berm in two different points, and after evading a minefield they crossed to the west bank of the wadi. Then the troops of the 2nd Brigade maneuvered northwards for six miles. Their orders were "Do not become decisively engaged, and do not attrit your force." At midday, a scout platoon reported that they were exchanging fire with the enemy. Seven Iraqi soldiers surrendered. As reinforcements were pushing forward, the column was ambushed by Iraqi troops using mortars and T-12 anti-tank guns hidden on the reverse slope of a low ridge. Intense direct and indirect fire erupted. The Brigade commander, Col. Randolph House, was personally forced to retreat rearwards after his M113 vehicle was nearly hit by several shells.

Before a skirmish line could be formed, an M163 Vulcan was destroyed by a 100 mm round. The gunner, Sergeant Jimmy D. Haws, was killed instantly. A Bradley IFV spraying 25 mm fire on Iraqi trenches was also hit; its gunner, Sergeant Ronald Randazzo, was killed and two other men were wounded as result. Another Bradley, commanded by Staff Sergeant Christopher Cichon, came forward to evacuate these casualties. While Sergeant Cichon and the soldiers from his Bradley were rescuing wounded personnel from the first Bradley, the Iraqis continued to fire. Private First Class Ardon Cooper covered a wounded man with his own body to shield him from enemy fire and was hit in the neck by a fragment from a mortar round, just as Sergeant Cichon's Bradley was struck on the turret by a round which shattered its TOW launcher, spraying Cooper with shrapnel. He died later from heavy loss of blood.  Cooper was posthumously awarded the Silver Star. Cichon's Bradley was still operational, and after picking up the wounded, its crew managed to withdraw it from the line of fire. Staff Sergeant Cichon was awarded the Silver Star for his exceptional leadership and courage while under enemy fire. Upon hearing of the seriousness of the injuries sustained by A Co,  the battalion Surgeon Capt Noel asked for a way to reach the wounded, Spc4 Phillip Adkins of C Co came forward with Sgt Frank Knox. Spc Adkins past the berm opening and made his way north and linked up with B Co before racing forward to A Co. While entoute to deliver Capt Noel and assist with evacuation of wounded, Spc Adkins received indirect fire from artillery hidden on the reverse slope. This resulted in the perforation of his humvee's fuel line, brake lines and splitting of his fuel tank. Spc Adkins managed to turn around and return to the berm while shielded by Abrams tanks. The battle raged for about an hour; after pounding the Iraqi positions with heavy artillery and A-10 air strikes, 1-5 fell back to the berm. During the pull-out, an Abrams tank hit a mine and was heavily damaged. Its crew was uninjured except for some bruises. The Iraqi defenders lost five tanks and 20 artillery pieces. American casualties amounted to three dead and nine wounded. The wisdom of a full-daylight operation was the subject of some criticism, but the Iraqi army remained convinced that the Coalition invasion would take place from the south.

Notes

References
 Atkinson, Rick: Crusade, The untold story of the Persian Gulf War.Houghton Mifflin Company, 1993. 
 Halberstadt, Hans: Desert Storm Ground War. Osceola, WI, Motorbooks International, 1991. 
 Jaco, Charles: The complete idiot's guide to the Gulf War. Alpha Books, 2002. 
 Lowry, Richard: The Gulf War Chronicles: A Military History of the First War with Iraq. iUniverse, 2003. 

1991 in Iraq
Battles of the Gulf War
Battles involving the United States
Tank battles involving the United States
Tank battles involving Iraq
February 1991 events in Asia